Jim Howie (25 September 1917 – 4 April 2006) was an  Australian rules footballer who played with Geelong in the Victorian Football League (VFL).

Notes

External links 

1917 births
2006 deaths
Australian rules footballers from Victoria (Australia)
Geelong Football Club players